Blue square may refer to:

 Blue SQ, a gambling company originally owned by The Rank Group but sold to Betfair in 2013.
 Piste#Ratings, a rating for ski trails
 Alon Blue Square, an Israeli holding company